Ashendon Junction in Buckinghamshire, England, was a major mainline railway junction where, from July 1910, the Great Western Railway's (GWR) London-Birmingham direct route diverged from the Great Central Railway's (GCR) main London-Sheffield route. It was near the small village of Ashendon, about 10 miles north-east of Oxford. 

The junction was where what is now the Chiltern Main Line (formerly the "Birmingham Direct Line" aka "Bicester cut-off" of the GWR), inaugurated in 1910, joined the post-1906 "Alternative Route" alignment of the GCR. It was a high-speed flying junction carrying southbound GWR trains from Birmingham via Bicester North (Engineer's Line Reference NAJ2) on an embankment with a girder bridge over the top of northbound Great Central trains travelling from London Marylebone on to the 90 mph five-mile link to Grendon Underwood Junction (Engineer's Line Reference GUA) where they rejoined the original Great Central Main Line towards Brackley and beyond to the East Midlands and North.

Closure

When the Great Central was closed south of Rugby in September 1966, the junction became redundant and the trackwork was later dismantled. The link to Grendon Underwood was already relatively little used by then, at least as far as passenger trains were concerned, most services from Marylebone towards Brackley and beyond using the original GC route through Aylesbury after long-distance expresses were ended in 1960.

Few signs of the old Great Central lines can now be seen from ground level on the site of the junction itself, but the trackbed is clearly visible from the air. Immediately north of the site, the Great Central trackbed towards Grendon Underwood is still intact.

Notes

Further reading

Rail junctions in England